The Livingston Avenue Historic District is a historic district located along Livingston Avenue between Hale and Morris Streets in New Brunswick, Middlesex County, New Jersey. The district was added to the National Register of Historic Places on February 16, 1996, for its significance in architecture, social history, and urban history from 1870 to 1929. It has 58 contributing buildings and 2 contributing sites, including the Willow Grove Cemetery, the Henry Guest House, and the New Brunswick Free Public Library.

Gallery

See also
William H. Johnson House
Civic Square 
National Register of Historic Places listings in Middlesex County, New Jersey
List of tallest buildings in New Brunswick

References

External links
 

National Register of Historic Places in Middlesex County, New Jersey
Historic districts on the National Register of Historic Places in New Jersey
New Jersey Register of Historic Places
Neighborhoods in New Brunswick, New Jersey